The Arakanese Muslim Association was a political party in Burma.

History
Affiliated with the Anti-Fascist People's Freedom League, the party won three seats in the Chamber of Deputies in the 1951–52 elections.

References

Defunct political parties in Myanmar